Yasser Nazmi is a Qatari football midfielder who played for Qatar in the 2000 Asian Cup. He also played for Qatar SC and Al Rayyan. He is the current assistant coach of the Qatar U17 team.

Career
He started his career in the youth teams of Al Nasr before moving to Qatar SC. He made his first team debut in 1992, under Džemaludin Mušović. He officially retired in 2007, taking up a job as a coach.

He earned over 80 caps and scored 10 goals for the Qatar national team.

References

External links
Kooora Profile

1973 births
Living people
Qatari footballers
Place of birth missing (living people)
Qatar international footballers
2000 AFC Asian Cup players
Qatar SC players
Al-Rayyan SC players
Qatar Stars League players
Association football midfielders